Organization for Bat Conservation (OBC) was a national environmental education nonprofit based in Bloomfield Hills, Michigan, established to educate and inspire people to save bats. In February 2018, it was announced that the Organization was ceasing operations due to unexpected financial problems and personnel changes.

History
Founded in 1992, OBC was a leading environmental educator focused on bats. Its home base was at the Cranbrook Institute of Science in Bloomfield Hills, Michigan, where OBC operated the Bat Zone, a live animal center with approximately 200 animals including bats from around the world and other nocturnal animals. Each year, thousands of visitors came to the Bat Zone to attend tours and participate in live animal educational programs. OBC educators traveled throughout the country to present education programs to children and adults at schools, festivals, museums, science and nature centers each year.

OBC also organized and participated in several special events. The Annual Great Lakes Bat Festival, started in 2002, was created to celebrate the role of bats in the Great Lakes ecosystem as insect eaters, while dispelling misconceptions that generate fears and threaten bats and their habitats around the world. The goal of the festival is to help people understand the impact to natural ecosystems and human economies should bat populations continue to decline.

Rob Mies was removed from his position as Executive Director of OBC in February 2018. 
Shortly after his dismissal, OBC announced that it would cease operation due to unexpected financial struggles.
Mies disagrees with the decision to dissolve OBC, and has called for the resignation of its board members to save the organization.

National Conservation Campaign
In September 2014, OBC launched a new public action campaign called Save the Bats. Save the Bats is aimed at preventing the decline of bat populations. Save the Bats encourages people to take local action to conserve bats, including installing bat houses, planting wildlife gardens, and teaching others about the importance of bats. The campaign has many celebrity, government agency and corporate supporters.

In addition, OBC and Warner Brothers Entertainment worked together on the set of Batman v Superman: Dawn of Justice to re-purpose parts of the movie set into bat houses. Director Zack Snyder contacted OBC when he heard about bats dying off from white-nose syndrome and enlisted Rob Mies, OBC Executive Director, to assist in the bat house design and construction. More than 150 bat houses were made on the movie set in Pontiac, some of which were painted and signed by Snyder, Amy Adams, and Ben Affleck. The bat houses will be auctioned off to support the Save the Bats campaign. Warner Brothers released a short PSA documenting the bat house build featuring Affleck encouraging people to join the campaign. To date, more than 1,000,000 people have viewed the video.

Property acquisition
In August 2017, Organization for Bat Conservation purchased the mineral rights for Magazine Mine, a silica mine in southern Illinois. Magazine Mine is one of the largest Indiana bat hibernacula in the world.

Collaborative worldwide conservation projects

North America
 Supporting White-Nose Fungus research
 Reducing wind farm mortality
 Bat house habitation success
 Land surveys for public and private land owner to identify roosts for protection
 Providing bat education seminars at Michigan Nature Centers funded by bat conservation grants from Critter Catchers, Inc.

Africa
 Protection on Mauritius Island regarding the Mauritian flying fox
 Education on the Island of Rodrigues regarding the Rodrigues flying fox
 Protection of the golden bat

Asia
 Teacher training workshops in Malaysia.

Australia
 Rescue project of the Australian spectacled flying fox

References

Bat conservation
Conservation biology
Nature conservation organizations based in the United States
Cranbrook Educational Community
Environmental organizations based in Michigan